Benyapa Aimsaard (born 29 August 2002) is a Thai badminton player.

Career 
Aimsaard educated at the Demonstration School of Bansomdejchaopraya Rajabhat University. She entered the international circuit in 2015, at a very young age of 13. At the Asian U–15 Junior Championships, she finished as mixed doubles runner-up with Setthanan Piyawatcharavijit. At the age of 15, she was able to compete in the senior international tournament, by becoming a finalist in the 2017 Lao International Series. Aimsaard later won the 2018 Asian U–17 Junior Championships in the girls' singles and doubles events. In 2019, she won the Mongolia Junior International in the girls' singles event, India Junior International both in singles and mixed doubles. Aimsaard was part of Thai team that won the first ever mixed team title at the Asian Junior Championships. She also won bronze medal at the Asian Junior Championships in the girls' singles and World Junior Championships in the mixed doubles event. Aimsaard won her first BWF world tour title at the 2022 India Open in the women's doubles event partnered with her sister Nuntakarn Aimsaard.

Achievements

Southeast Asian Games 
Women's doubles

World Junior Championships 
Mixed doubles

Asian Junior Championships 
Girls' singles

BWF World Tour (4 titles, 3 runners-up) 
The BWF World Tour, which was announced on 19 March 2017 and implemented in 2018, is a series of elite badminton tournaments sanctioned by the Badminton World Federation (BWF). The BWF World Tours are divided into levels of World Tour Finals, Super 1000, Super 750, Super 500, Super 300, and the BWF Tour Super 100.

Women's doubles

BWF International Challenge/Series (3 runners-up) 
Women's singles

Mixed doubles

  BWF International Challenge tournament
  BWF International Series tournament
  BWF Future Series tournament

BWF Junior International (3 titles) 
Girls' singles

Mixed doubles

  BWF Junior International Grand Prix tournament
  BWF Junior International Challenge tournament
  BWF Junior International Series tournament
  BWF Junior Future Series tournament

References

External links 

2002 births
Living people
Benyapa Aimsaard
Benyapa Aimsaard
Competitors at the 2021 Southeast Asian Games
Benyapa Aimsaard
Southeast Asian Games medalists in badminton